Shri Ram Janki Sanskrit Mahavidyalaya is a government aided sanskrit post graduate college affiliated to Sampurnanand Sanskrit University Varanasi. It is located in Gauriyapur (Akbarpur), Kanpur Dehat district in Uttar Pradesh, India.

History

It was founded by Badri Das  chief of the Shri Ram Janki Dharma Prasar Samiti Gauriyapur in 1929. Initially it  was known a Sanskrit Pathshala with  Ancient Indian Culture.

Custodian
 Mahamandaleshwar Shri Shri 108 Devnarayan Das (Vedantacharya) is main custodian of this Sanskrit Mahavidyalaya

Gurukul Pranali

It is famous for its Gurukul Pranali Education (Ashram Pranali Education) in Uttar Pradesh. It is a center of education for Ancient Indian Culture.

Location

It is located in Gauriyapur village in picturesque surroundings, east side of Kanpur-Agra National Highway, 8 kilometres from Akbarpur to the southwest.

Hostel

Ashram Pranali based Limited hostel is available (for 80 students)

Courses

Purva Madhyama     I, II
Uttar Madhyama     I, II
Shastri            I, II, III
Acharya 
 (Sahitya)          I, II 
 (Navya-Vyakaran)  I, II
 (Veda)            I, II
(Vedant)           I, II

List of Principals

Laxmi Narayan Chaturvedi(1945-1982)
Ram Roop Das (1982-1984) (off.)
Ram Autar Agnihotri(1984-1991) (off.)
Govind Das (1991-1992) (off.)
Ram Kumar Das (1992-2002)
Ram Autar Agnihotri(2002-2010)  (off. )
Ved Narayan Pandey(2010-June 2015)  (off.) 
Arun Kumar Tripathi(July 2015--- Present day)

Management

President:
Manager: Ramakant Mishra
Secretary :

Gallery

External links
 https://web.archive.org/web/20160708212547/http://www.ssvv.ac.in/

References

Sanskrit universities in India
Colleges in Uttar Pradesh
Education in Kanpur Dehat district
Educational institutions established in 1929
1929 establishments in India
Sampurnanand Sanskrit Vishwavidyalaya